Nepal has competed in twelve Summer Games, and in four Winter Olympic Games.

Tejbir Bura, a Nepali national, won an Olympic gold medal in alpinism at the 1924 Winter Olympics for his role as a member of the 1922 British Mount Everest expedition. As citizens of other countries took part in the expedition as well, the award went to a mixed team. This event and its honorees do not appear at the online International Olympic Committee website.

Nepal's taekwondo practitioner Bidhan Lama won a bronze medal at the 1988 Summer Olympics in Seoul, however it isn't counted as an official medal since taekwondo was a demonstration sport during the 1988 Summer Olympics.

The Nepal Olympic Committee was formed in 1962 and recognized in 1963.

Medal tables

Medals by Summer Games

Medals by Winter Games

See also
 List of flag bearers for Nepal at the Olympics
 List of Olympic athletes of Nepal
 Nepal at the Paralympics
 Nepal national under-23 football team
 Nepal Olympic Committee
 Nepal Olympic Museum

References

External links
 
 
 
 Nepal Olympic Committee Home page